Cec Hammer (24 June 1926 – 1 April 2013) was an Australian rules footballer who played with Geelong in the Victorian Football League (VFL).

Hammer made two appearances for Geelong in the 1945 VFL season, against Carlton at Kardinia Park in round eight and St Kilda at Junction Oval in round nine. He previously played under-18s at Newtown & Chilwell.

A half back flanker, Hammer played in the Tasmanian Football League for North Hobart in 1948 and 1949. He then joined Sandy Bay and in 1952 was a member of their premiership team. In 1953, Hammer represented Tasmania at the Adelaide Carnival.

References

1926 births
Australian rules footballers from Victoria (Australia)
Geelong Football Club players
Newtown & Chilwell Football Club players
North Hobart Football Club players
Sandy Bay Football Club players
2013 deaths